The Living Dead (German: Die lebende Tote) is a 1919 German silent film directed by Rudolf Biebrach and starring Henny Porten, Paul Bildt and Elsa Wagner.

The film's sets were designed by the art director Kurt Dürnhöfer and Jack Winter.

Cast
 Henny Porten as Eva von Redlich 
 Paul Bildt as Professor von Redlich 
 Elsa Wagner as Brigitte 
 Ernst Dernburg as Von der Tann 
 Carl Ebert
 Hans von Zedlitz as Graf Karl Lanza

References

Bibliography
 Bock, Hans-Michael & Bergfelder, Tim. The Concise CineGraph. Encyclopedia of German Cinema. Berghahn Books, 2009.

External links

1919 films
Films of the Weimar Republic
Films directed by Rudolf Biebrach
German silent feature films
German black-and-white films
UFA GmbH films